In philately, a ship cover is a cover that was mailed aboard a ship, while a naval cover is one posted on a navy vessel. Shipboard postal facilities are ubiquitous on ships of any size, although the "post office" may consist only of an alcove and a sailor working it part-time.

Ship covers usually carry a paquebot postmark and/or a postmark unique to the vessel. Collectors of ship covers will look for different types used at different periods, as well as for covers indicating routing through particular ports, and so forth.

The Universal Ship Cancellation Society, founded in 1932, specializes in the study of naval covers, particularly those of the US Navy.

References
Catalog of United States Naval Postmarks

External links
Universal Ship Cancellation Society homepage

Philatelic terminology